The Berta monastery is a former Georgian Orthodox monastery at the village of Ortaköy (formerly Berta), Artvin Province, Turkey. It was built in the 8th or 9th century. The surviving structure is now used as a mosque.

History 

The Monastery of the Mother of God in Berta or Bertay is first mentioned by the 10th-century Georgian author Giorgi Merchule as a part of Georgian monastic communities operating under the guidance of Grigol of Khandzta (759–861) in what then was the Georgian Bagratid principality of Klarjeti. The monastery sat on a hill overlooking what is now the village of Ortaköy and consisted of several structures, of which the main church was a domed structure faced with smoothly finished small blocks. After the Ottoman takeover of the area in the 16th century, the church was abandoned. In the 19th century, the remaining edifice was converted into a mosque and a minaret was added to it. The ruins of a large rectangular refectory have survived to the north of the former church.

Berta manuscripts 
The monastery also functioned as a center for literary activities. Two important Georgian manuscripts known as the Berta Gospels have survived. One, dating from 988, is preserved at the Museum of Andover Newton Theological School in the United States; the other (Q-906) dates from the 12th century and is kept at the National Center for Manuscripts in Tbilisi, Georgia. Its gilded book-cover is attributed to the 12th-century master Beshken of Opiza.

References

External links 
 

Georgian churches in Turkey
Tao-Klarjeti
Mosques converted from churches in the Ottoman Empire